was a prominent Okinawan karate master and also at times a Naha City Councilman and a Criminal Investigator for the United States Marine Corps.

Early life
Takayoshi was born in Naha, Okinawa as the son of Shoshin Nagamine, the founder of Matsubayashi-ryu Karate-do. He commenced training in Matsubayashi-ryu Karate-do under his father's tutelage at the age of seven years.

Career
At the direction of his father, and in order to help the development of Matsubayashi-ryu Karate-do world-wide, Takayoshi went to the United States at the age of 20, in the late 1960s, and opened a dojo in Cincinnati, Ohio. Takayoshi Nagamines' original students to achieve black belt in the United States included Jim Driggs, Rick Kemper, Al Rozier, Bill George, Dave Williams, Bill Weiss and Steve Rafferty. Nagamine Sensei also taught clinics and seminars in the Midwest Ohio region and around the United States until he returned to Okinawa in 1979. The Life of Soke Nagamine (A Simple Man)

Takayoshi returned to Okinawa in order to assist his father, Shoshin Nagamine with the running of the World Honbu Dojo and the World Matsubayashi-ryu (Shorin-ryu) Karate-do Association (WMKA). In 1991, Shoshin Nagamine retired from running the Matsubayashi-ryu organisation and in a speech passed the leadership on to his son, Takayoshi.

In 1992 Takayoshi called together senior instructors in Okinawa and the United States and formed what is now known as the World Matsubayashi-ryu (Shorin-ryu) Karate-do Association (WMKA). In 1997 after his father's death, Takayoshi took the position as the second Sōke (head) of the Matsubayashi-ryu Karate-do system. Soke Nagamine moved from the US in 2004 leaving to return to Okinawa to administrate the WMKA. In October 2008, Takayoshi was promoted to the rank of Hanshisei 10th Dan in Matsubayashi-ryu. Takayoshi coordinated and participated in the development, establishment and teaching at dojos throughout the world including, but not limited to Australia, United States, Germany, Norway, Ireland and Canada.)

References

1945 births
2012 deaths
People from Naha
Shōrin-ryū practitioners